Henry Arnold Karo (December 24, 1903 – May 23, 1986) was a vice admiral in the former United States Coast and Geodetic Survey Corps, which is today known as the National Oceanic and Atmospheric Administration Commissioned Officer Corps. Vice Admiral Karo spent most of his working career in the United States Coast and Geodetic Survey, which provided coastal maps and charts for the United States. He rose through the organization's bureaucracy to become the director of the Survey.

Karo had been involved in the Survey since 1923, but the advent of World War II forced him to take on other duties.  In this period, he rose to the rank of rear admiral.  At war's end, he returned to the Coast and Geodetic Survey.

World War II

Karo was transferred from the Coast and Geodeic Survey to the United States Army Air Forces in World War II, when he was commanding officer of the Air Force Aeronautical Chart Center in St. Louis.  Initially, he was given the Army rank of major, and was promoted to colonel during this period, but he returned to the Coast and Geodetic Survey as with the rank of rear admiral (see photo caption) at the end of the war.

US Coast and Geodetic Survey
President Dwight Eisenhower named Rear Admiral Karo to succeed Rear Admiral Robert Francis Anthony Studds as Director of the Coast and Geodetic Survey in 1955.  The recess appointment was subsequently made permanent by Senate confirmation.

From 1955 through 1965, Karo directed the Survey.  In 1957, Karo oversaw an organization with a $10-million budget, 17 ships and 2,000 employees. In that same year, the Survey's publications list offered over 2,000 aerial and nautical maps and guides; and over 44 million of its documents were issued.

Establishing the US standard mile

A mile is a unit of length, usually used to measure distance; however, the measurement varied amongst a number of national systems.  There were (and remain today) some slight differences depending on whether a mile is construed in terms of Imperial units, United States customary units, or Norwegian/Swedish mil. In the 1950s, Karo headed the project which established the U.S. survey mile (also known as U.S. statute mile) of 5,280 survey feet which is slightly longer at approximately 1,609.347 219 meters (1 international mile is exactly 0.999 998 survey mile).

Karo was promoted to vice admiral just before he left the Coast and Geodetic Survey to help create a new government agency which would eventually merge the Survey with two other formerly independent agencies.

Environmental Science Services Administration
From 1965, until his retirement in 1967, he was the deputy administrator of the National Oceanic and Atmospheric Administration's predecessor agency, the Environmental Science Services Administration.

Later years
Karo died of respiratory failure at Georgetown University Hospital, in Washington, D.C. He was 82 years old.

Commemoration
The Society of American Military Engineers Karo Award – a NOAA Association decoration presented annually as a group award to a field unit of the National Ocean Service for an outstanding contribution in an engineering or scientific field – is named for Karo.

Notes

References
 Astin, V. and H. Arnold Karo. (1959). Refinement of values for the yard and the pound, Washington DC: National Bureau of Standards, republished on  National Geodetic Survey web site and the Federal Register (Doc. 59-5442, Filed, June 30, 1959, 8:45 a.m.)
 Karo, H. Arnold.  "New Nautical Charting Methods Called an Aid to Yachting Safety," New York Times. January 15, 1956.
 National Oceanic and Atmospheric Administration:  Coast & Geodetic Survey Biographies, Adm. Karo (1966).

1903 births
1986 deaths
People from Lyons, Nebraska
Military personnel from Nebraska
American geodesists
United States Coast and Geodetic Survey Corps admirals
Environmental Science Services Administration Corps admirals
United States Army Air Forces officers
United States Army Air Forces personnel of World War II